Amir Ali Hajizadeh (born 28 February 1962 in Tehran) is commander of Aerospace Force of the Islamic Revolutionary Guard Corps since October 2009.

During Eghtedar-e Velayat war game, on 8 March 2016, Hajizadeh said: "the reason we designed our missiles with a range of 2,000 km is to be able to hit our enemies from a safe distance."

U.S. and Canada sanctions 
On 24 June 2019, the U.S. Treasury Department sanctioned him, freezing any of his U.S. assets and banning U.S. persons from doing business with him.

On 29 September 2022, following the protests to the death of Mahsa Amini, Canada added Amir Ali Hajizadeh's name to Consolidated Canadian Autonomous Sanctions List.

The downing of PS752 
Hajizadeh was the commander of Aerospace Force of IRGC on 8 January 2020 when two surface-to-air missiles were shot to the Boeing 737-800, killing all 176 passengers and crew. Islamic Republic of Iran denied that missile brought down the plane for three days and pretended it was a plane crash. Some in Iran's media even called it impossible. As the evidence and international pressures escalated, IRGC issued a letter on 11 January 2020 and Hajizadeh accepted "full responsibility" for the shootdown. Despite this letter, no-one from IRGC, including Hajizadeh, has been demoted or punished for the crime.

About three years later, in November 2022, Hajizadeh blamed others for late acceptance of responsibility: "The decision was made after 48 hours. We knew what happened from the first hour, but other entities and organizations did not accept it.", he also added "48 hours is not too long (to tell the truth)".

Threat to kill Donald Trump and Mike Pompeo 

In February 2023 Hajizadeh claimed Iran has developed a cruise missile with a range of 1,650 km, and threatened to kill former US President Donald Trump and former US Secretary of State Mike Pompeo. "God willing, we are looking to kill Trump. Pompeo ...and military commanders who issued the order (to kill Quds Force commander Qasem Soleimani) should be killed," Hajizadeh said in the television interview.

References 

Living people
1962 births
People from Tehran
Islamic Revolutionary Guard Corps brigadier generals
Iranian individuals subject to the U.S. Department of the Treasury sanctions